Zadoc P. Dederick was an American inventor. Along with Isaac Grass he was the creator of a steam-powered humanlike robot designed to pull a cart. The invention was patented on March 24, 1868, as patent 75874,  and operated through a system of levers and cranks, attached to steam-powered pistons and a boiler. The original prototype cost $2,000 (equivalent to about $39,458 in 2020) and was built in Newark, New Jersey. Plans to produce it for $300 never went through, making this an example of an early development in steam power that was abandoned.  Nonetheless, inventions such as this one spurred interest in steam power, as exemplified by novels such as The Steam Man of the Prairies, and by many imitations and hoaxes that appeared as a result.

See also
History of steam road vehicles

References

19th-century American inventors
History of the steam engine
Place of birth missing
Place of death missing
Year of birth missing
Year of death missing